The Salings is a civil parish in the Braintree District in Essex, England. It includes Bardfield Saling and Great Saling. The civil parish has 475 inhabitants (2011).

See also
The Hundred Parishes

References

Civil parishes in Essex
Braintree District